Torr may refer to:

 Torr, a unit of pressure named for physicist Evangelista Torricelli
 Torr (surname), an English surname (including a list of persons with the name)
 Torr Works, a limestone quarry in Somerset, England
 Torr., the standard botanical author abbreviation for John Torrey
 Torr Head, a headland in Northern Ireland in the barony of Cary

See also 

 
 
 Tor (disambiguation)
 Thor (disambiguation)
 The Torrs, hills in Devon, England
 Torrs Hydro, a micro hydroelectric scheme in Derbyshire, England
 Torr Marro, American lacrosse player